359 (three hundred [and] fifty-nine) is the natural number following 358 and preceding 360. 359 is the 72nd prime number.

In mathematics
359 is a Sophie Germain prime: 2(359)+1=719 (also a Sophie Germain prime.)
It is also a safe prime, because subtracting 1 and halving it gives another prime number (179, itself also safe).
Since the reversal of its digits gives 953, which is prime, it is also an emirp.

In other fields
 According to the author Douglas Adams, 359 is the funniest three-digit number.

Integers